Casey Plett (born June 20, 1987) is a Canadian writer, best known for her novel Little Fish and Giller Prize-nominated short story collection A Dream of a Woman.

Personal life 
Plett was born in Winnipeg, Manitoba and grew up in a Mennonite family in Morden, Manitoba. She attended high school in Eugene, Oregon and later moved to Portland for college and New York for graduate school. She currently lives in Windsor, Ontario.

Career 
Plett previously wrote a regular column about her gender transition for McSweeney's Internet Tendency. She is a book reviewer for the Winnipeg Free Press and has published work in Rookie, Plenitude, The Walrus, and Two Serious Ladies.

In addition to her work as an author she is the co-editor with Cat Fitzpatrick of Meanwhile, Elsewhere: Science Fiction and Fantasy from Transgender Writers, an anthology of speculative fiction from trans authors from Topside Press. Meanwhile, Elsewhere received a Stonewall Book Award in 2018. She has cited Imogen Binnie, Elena Rose, and Julia Serano as some of her influences.

Her short story collection A Dream of a Woman was longlisted for the 2021 Giller Prize.

Plett was on the Giller Prize jury in 2022.

Awards

Works

References

External links
Casey Plett

Living people
Canadian bloggers
Canadian columnists
Canadian literary critics
Women literary critics
Canadian women short story writers
Canadian women novelists
Lambda Literary Award winners
Stonewall Book Award winners
Transgender women
Canadian transgender writers
Writers from Winnipeg
Writers from Windsor, Ontario
Writers from Manitoba
21st-century Canadian short story writers
21st-century Canadian women writers
21st-century Canadian novelists
Canadian women columnists
Canadian women bloggers
1987 births
Canadian LGBT novelists
Mennonite writers
Canadian Mennonites
LGBT Mennonites
Amazon.ca First Novel Award winners
Transgender novelists
21st-century Canadian LGBT people